The qilaut (Inuit: "that by means of which the spirits are called up", syllabic: ᕿᓚᐅᑦ) or qilaat (Greenlandic) is a type of frame drum native to the Inuit cultures of the Arctic.

The drum is distinctive in that it has a handle and is made of caribou skin, which is not particularly resonant, giving it a dull, rumbling sound. It is beaten with a stick, the qatuk.

References

Membranophones
Inuit musical instruments
North American percussion instruments
Canadian musical instruments